Monica Stevens (born 14 January 1967) is an Antigua and Barbuda sprinter. She competed in the women's 4 × 400 metres relay at the 1984 Summer Olympics. She is among only 65 Olympians to compete from Antigua and Barbuda.

References

External links
 

1967 births
Living people
Athletes (track and field) at the 1984 Summer Olympics
Antigua and Barbuda female sprinters
Olympic athletes of Antigua and Barbuda
Place of birth missing (living people)
Olympic female sprinters